Maribel Riera (born 7 January 1980) is a Venezuelan softball player. She competed in the women's tournament at the 2008 Summer Olympics.

References

1980 births
Living people
Venezuelan softball players
Olympic softball players of Venezuela
Softball players at the 2008 Summer Olympics
People from Falcón